Sallanches-Combloux-Megève station is a railway station in the commune of Sallanches, in the French department of Haute-Savoie. It is located on the standard gauge La Roche-sur-Foron–Saint-Gervais-les-Bains-Le Fayet line of SNCF.

Services 
 the following services stop at Sallanches-Combloux-Megève:

References

External links 
 
 

Railway stations in Haute-Savoie